Gongora seideliana is a species of orchid found in Mexico (Chiapas).

References

seideliana
Orchids of Mexico
Orchids of Chiapas